East Risdon State Reserve is an IUCN Category II protected area on the eastern shore of the Derwent River in Clarence City, Hobart, Tasmania. It takes its name from the nearby suburb of Risdon.

The earliest registration as a protected area was 17 March 1971., and is currently managed by Tasmania Parks and Wildlife Service

The rare flowering plant Eucalyptus risdonii is endemic to the area, and the endangered Eucalyptus morrisbyi has the smaller of its two remaining native stands within the reserve. Also found in surveys of the reserve have been Black peppermint, Prickly moses, Silver Wattle, Blackwood, Native daphne (var. obcordata), Dolly bush, Common heath, Golden pea, Spreading wattle, grass, Manna Gum or White Gum, and Blue gum

It encompasses Shag Bay and the northern half of Bedlam Walls. It is a site of note to Aboriginal Tasmanians

References 

Wilderness areas of Tasmania
City of Clarence
State reserves of Tasmania
Southern Tasmania
Birdwatching sites